Nadaism (meaning "Nothing-ism" in English) was an artistic and philosophical counterculture movement in Colombia prevalent from 1958 to 1964. The movement was founded by writer Gonzalo Arango and was influenced by nihilism, existentialism, and the works of Colombian writer and philosopher Fernando González Ochoa. Nadaism was largely a movement in reaction to La Violencia and was the Colombian expression of numerous avant-garde-like movements in the poetry of the Americas during the 1950s and 60s, such as the Beat Generation in the United States and the Tzanticos in Ecuador. The movement was largely anti-establishment. It resulted in several works of literature, music, and movies expressing Nadaist themes.

The term nadaísmo was a play on the words "nada", meaning nothing, and "Dadaism". Nadaísmo has sometimes been called "Colombian dadaism", a "Colombian Beat Generation", or "Colombian Futurism".

History
The violent events in Colombia during the 1940s and 1950s permeate the works of Nadaist writers. Events such as La Violencia and the military government of Gustavo Rojas Pinilla, as well as a considerable urban expansion, greatly influenced the formation of the Nadaísta (Nothing-ist) movement. Arango had originally supported Pinilla when he came to power in Colombia, joining the  Movimiento Amplio Nacional (Broad National Movement) composed of artists and young intellectuals that supported the dictator. In this period, Arango devoted himself to journalism. Soon, however, the reaction of the leaders of conservatives and liberals against Rojas was manifested in an agreement that caused his fall on May 10, 1957. While the dictator was exiled in Spain, Gonzalo Arango eventually fled to Medellín, Colombia.

Arango began the Nadaist movement in 1958 when his 42-page "Nadaism Manifesto", signed as "gonzaloarango", was published in the magazine Amistad (meaning "Friendship") in Medellín. Arango and other writers would write about their disillusionment with the government they had supported.

Some of the first people to join the new movement were Alberto Escobar and Amilkar Osorio. As an inauguration, in 1958 they burned Colombian literature in the Plazuela de San Ignacio in Medellín as a symbol against what was considered the traditional great works of Colombian literature. Works that they denounced included the earlier literary movements such as Los Nuevos. One of the books they burned was Arango's first work, "After the Man".

The movement ended largely with the deaths of its founding members. Toward the end of his life, Arango distanced himself from the beliefs of the other members associated with the movement.

Prominent figures
Authors who were part of this movement include:

Additionally, Los Speakers, The Young Beats, and Los Yetis were rock bands associated with this movement.

Notable works
 From Nothing to Nadaism (1963), Gonzalo Arango, a poetry anthology
  (1974), Gonzalo Arango, a poetry anthology selected by Jotamario Arbeláez
  (1966), Mario Rivero
 , Fanny Buitrago 
 Los ojos del basilisco, Germán Espinosa
 Nadaismo a Go-Go!, Los Yetis, a CD

See also
 Stone and Sky (movement)
 Colombian literature
 Latin American Boom

References

Colombian culture
Literary movements
Colombian literature